Hood College is a private college in Frederick, Maryland. In fall 2018, Hood enrolled 2,052 students (1,092 undergraduate students; 960 graduate students). Thirty-eight percent of students are either members of under-represented racial or ethnic populations or from foreign countries.

It was established in 1893 by the Potomac Synod of the Reformed Church in the United States as the Woman's College of Frederick. An all-female institution until 1971, the college initially admitted men only as commuters. This continued until 2003, when male students were extended the option of residential status.

History

Early history (1893–1944)
The college was founded in 1893 as the Woman's College of Frederick by the Potomac Synod of the Reformed Church of the United States. Dr. Joseph Henry Apple, an educator from Pittsburgh, Pennsylvania, only 28 years of age at the time of his appointment, was named the college's first president. In this first year, eighty-three women enrolled, and were taught by eight faculty members in Winchester Hall, located on East Church Street in Frederick. Classes were offered in the liberal arts and music, as well as secretarial trades. In 1898, the first class graduated, with fourteen women earning Bachelor of Arts degrees. Over the next several years, courses in biology, economics, sociology, political science, and domestic science were added.

In 1897, the college received a  tract of land for its campus from Margaret Scholl Hood. In 1913, the Trustees of the Woman's College announced that the name of the Woman's College would be changed to Hood College, in honor of Mrs. Hood, who gave $25,000 to establish an endowment for the college, and who firmly believed in higher education for women. On January 18, 1913, Margaret Hood's will was filed for probate.  In the will, she bequeathed an additional $30,000 to the Woman's College of Frederick provided that the college had changed its name to "Hood College". Part of this bequest was used to fund the 1914 construction of Alumnae Hall.  Today, except for Brodbeck Hall, which was built in the 1860s and stood on the campus at its founding, Alumnae Hall remains the oldest building on the college's campus and serves as the central location for the college's administration, also housing the sociology and social work department.  In 1915, the college began its move from its former location in Frederick City to its current campus.

In 1934, Joseph Henry Apple retired as the college's president, having served for 41 years. At his retirement, he was the oldest college president in continuous active service at a single institution in the United States.

The Hood College Historic District was listed on the National Register of Historic Places in 2002. The campus is within close walking distance of downtown Frederick. In 2010, Forbes named downtown Frederick one of America's best neighborhoods, and in 2013, Forbes published the results of a Farmers Insurance Group study naming the Bethesda–Gaithersburg–Frederick, Maryland area one of the most secure metro areas in which to live in the United States.

Transition to co-education (1970–2003)
In the early 1970s, Hood College began to consider becoming a co-educational institution. In October of that year the Hood College Board of Trustees voted to begin enrollment of men as commuter students. That same year, Hood also decided to begin a graduate school program for both men and women. These changes were implemented in January 1971.

There were mixed feelings on campus as Hood students worried about the type of male student Hood could potentially attract. Students feared that a residential women's college would attract only the "provincial townies" unable to go anywhere else, and the "lusty lovers" attracted by the high number of females. This led to public debate in The Blue and Grey, the Hood College campus newspaper, and letters to the student body from then-president Randle Elliot.

Beginning in January 1971, the college became open to men as commuters. The first male student, Aldan T. Weinberg, transferred to Hood after having spent one year at American University and three years in the army.
Weinberg taught journalism at Hood and served as the director of the Communications Program until he retired in 2015.

In the fall of 2001, the Hood executive committee was charged by the board of trustees with the task of studying the possible impact of male resident students. This study considered the projected financial, cultural, residential, academic and enrollment impacts on the college. Based on this report, the board of trustees' ultimate decision was to admit men as residential students.

This decision was made based upon the reality that demand for single-sex education for women was on the decline.  Only three percent of college-bound female students preferred a single-gender institution. This, and other factors, led to an overall decline in undergraduate enrollment over the years. Hood needed at least 300 new, enrolled students each year in order to have a balanced budget.  All in all, Hood's expenses were exceeding revenue.

This led to the creation of a co-education task force composed of students, alumnae, faculty and staff members. This task force ultimately decided where men were to be housed.

Present day 
In an effort to accommodate student growth and to shift away from students who commute to campus, a new residence hall was finished in 2021 and has 64 units. This residence hall will house 201 beds and will be home to the honors program.

Traditions
Hood College students participate in a number of long-standing traditions, some of which date back nearly 100 years, such as the "Hood Hello."

Class banners

Each class decorates a banner to be displayed in the dining hall.  The banners correspond to each class' assigned color, red, green, blue or yellow. Every year, a new representative symbol is designed and painted on the banners. Following a class' graduation, the banners are hung in the atrium of the Whitaker Campus Center.

Columns So Fair

Alumnae Hall's four Ionic columns are named Hope, Opportunity, Obligation and Democracy (HOOD). The columns were dedicated by the classes of 1915, 1916, 1917 and 1918. Many buildings on campus that were constructed after Alumnae Hall also have four columns, but the inspiration for the columns themselves probably came from the six columns on each of the twin buildings that comprise Winchester Hall, the original buildings of the Woman's College in downtown Frederick.

Dinks

Dinks (or colored beanie hats) have been a Hood College tradition since at least the 1950s. According to some sources, the tradition may have started very early in the 20th century with colored armbands rather than beanies, although the wearing of beanies is officially documented as beginning in the 1950s. There is reason to believe this is true, as ceremonial colored beanies were also used by women's colleges such as Wellesley during the early 1900s. Upon arriving at Hood, the members of each incoming class are given dinks with its class color, either blue, green, yellow or red. The four colors rotate so that the color of the previous year's seniors goes to the incoming freshmen. In the past, dinks were worn at special events such as Campus Day, and freshmen were previously required to wear their dinks continuously during their first few weeks on campus. Now, they are primarily worn during opening convocation, Policies for Dollars, and baccalaureate.

Midnight and Strawberry Breakfasts

Begun in the 1980s, Midnight Breakfast is held each semester the night before final exams begin and is served by College faculty and staff.

Originally held on the morning of May Day, Strawberry Breakfast now takes places on the morning of Commencement.

The Pergola

Located in the geographical center of Hood's residential quad since 1915, the Pergola is a wooden dome-like structure covered with wisteria.  Before 1915 a Pergola was located at the East Church Street campus and was the inspiration for the current structure.  Several traditions are associated with the Pergola, such as the decoration of the pergola with holiday lights during the holiday season. Students are not to speak any harsh words under the Pergola or "split poles" with friends, as this might lead to a failed friendship after graduation.

Policies for Dollars

Policies for Dollars is a competition in which the freshmen of each residence hall compete to raise money for their respective halls. The winning dorm also receives the "pink spoon," a giant plastic trophy of sentimental value. Typical activities in the competition include Hood trivia, dorm cheers and skits.

Accreditations 
Hood College is accredited by the Middle States Commission on Higher Education and the following bodies for specific degrees:

 Undergraduate business and MBA by the Accreditation Council for Business Schools and Programs
 Bachelor's degree in computer science by ABET
 Counseling programs by Council for the Accreditation of Counseling and Related Educational Programs (CACREP)
 Education programs by the National Council for Accreditation of Teacher Education (NCATE) which merged with another organization to form the Council for the Accreditation of Educator Preparation (CAEP)
 Nursing programs by The Maryland Nursing Board and the Maryland Higher Education Commission; the BSN by the Commission on Collegiate Nursing Education
 Social work program by the Council on Social Work Education

Academics
Hood College offers 33 undergraduate majors, 19 master's degree programs and 10 post-baccalaureate certification programs, including certification programs in education.  Hood College has consistently been ranked in the U.S. News & World Report list for Best University in the Northeast.

Departmental honors

Each spring students selected by the academic departments make presentations of their completed year-long research projects. These students are known as Tischer Scholars, in honor of Christine P. Tischer, alumna and former member of the Hood College Board of Trustees. In the spring of 2013, 22 seniors gave presentations on topics that varied from "First Generation College Students: Challenges and Solutions" to "Effects of Stream Nutrients on Salamander Species Diversity and Abundance."

Honors program

The Hood College Honors Program is a selective program of study, admitting only a limited number of students each year. Students in the Honors Program take an interdisciplinary seminar each semester, as well as participate in community service, study abroad or internships, and Senior Seminar, allowing students to choose a topic of broad interest and selecting a faculty member to teach the course.

Study abroad
Hood College offers a study abroad program that can be utilized by any student with any major. Some majors require students to spend a semester abroad, including foreign language and literature students.

Graduate school

The Hood College Graduate School is the oldest graduate school in the region. It opened in the summer of 1971 after approval of the program by the college faculty in the fall of 1970 and approval by the State of Maryland in December 1970.  The first graduate program was a Master of Arts in Human Sciences.  Concentrations were available in Contemporary Government, Counseling and Guidance, Early Childhood Education, Elementary Science and Mathematics, Environmental Science, Public Affairs, Reading, and Special Education.  Over the ensuing forty years, that single program has evolved into fifteen master's degree programs and thirteen post-baccalaureate certificate programs.

Athletics
Hood College athletics began in 1898 with the first basketball team.  In the early 1900s, field hockey, tennis, archery and swimming were among the sports added to the athletics program.  Gambrill Gymnasium was constructed in 1949 and served as the main athletic facility for the campus until the dedication of the new Athletic Center in November 2011. In March 2015 it was renamed the Ronald J. Volpe Athletic Center in honor of the former president.  In 1984, Hood College became a member of the National Collegiate Athletic Association and joined the Division III Chesapeake Women's Athletic Conference.  When the CWAC disbanded, Hood joined the Atlantic Women's Colleges Conference in 1990.  In 2006, Hood joined the Capital Athletic Conference (CAC).

Hood presently offers intercollegiate varsity teams in men's and women's basketball, baseball, men's and women's cross country, field hockey, men's and women's golf, men's and women's lacrosse, men's and women's soccer, softball, men's and women's swimming, men's and women's tennis, men's and women's track and field, and women's volleyball. The college also offers club level equestrian and cheer programs.

The men's teams began competition in the Capital Athletic Conference for the 2006–2007 academic year along with women's cross country and track and field.  All other women's sports remained in the AWCC for the 2006–2007 year and moved to the CAC in 2007–2008. Hood joined the 17-member Middle Atlantic Conferences in July 2012. Hood College student-athletes train in the Ronald J. Volpe Athletic Center, which includes the BB&T arena.

The nickname for Hood athletics is the Blazers.  This dates back to the 1920s when the campus elected a rising senior as the "White Sweater" girl as someone who possessed the most sportsmanship and school spirit.  In 1928, the sweater was changed to a blazer and the tradition continued through the mid-1900s.  Today, the nickname is represented by a thoroughbred horse with a "blaze" mark on its forehead.

Notable people

Alumni
 Beverly Byron, 1964, US congresswoman
 Marcia Coyle, 1973, journalist and lawyer; Washington Bureau Chief of The National Law Journal; panelist on the PBS NewsHour
 David Gallaher, 1998, graphic novelist and children's book author
 Gale L. Gamble, 1969, physician, cancer specialist, medical director at the Rehabilitation Institute of Chicago
 Heather Hamilton, 1995, executive director of the Connect US Fund
 Sue Hecht, 1985, American politician, member of the Democratic Party, member of the Maryland House of delegates
 Sophie Kerr, 1898, journalist, novelist, and playwright
 Claire McCardell, 1927, fashion designer in the arena of ready-to-wear clothing in the 20th century
 Halo Meadows, 1927, actress, writer and burlesque dancer, also known by the pseudonym "Louise Howard"
 Laura Lee Miller, 1973, President of Vera Wang Licensing
 Beryl Pfizer, 1949, producer of NBC News
 Arlene Raven, 1965, feminist art historian, author, critic, educator, and curator
 James N. Robey, 1986, member of the Maryland Senate
 Beverley Swaim-Stanley, 1977, 1982, Maryland Transportation Secretary
 Kelly M. Schulz, 2006, American politician and member of the Maryland House of Delegates
 Elena Maria Vidal, 1984, historical novelist and noted blogger 
 Patricia Wright, 1966, scientist, environmental activist
 Tina Wells, 1980, American entrepreneur, writer and CEO of Buzz Marketing Group

Faculty
 Roser Caminals-Heath, professor, Spanish and English language author
 Anita Jose, professor, business strategist

References

External links

 

 
1893 establishments in Maryland
Educational institutions established in 1893
Former women's universities and colleges in Maryland
Historic districts on the National Register of Historic Places in Maryland
National Register of Historic Places in Frederick County, Maryland
Universities and colleges in Frederick County, Maryland
University and college buildings on the National Register of Historic Places in Maryland
Private universities and colleges in Maryland